Johannes Kepler (1571–1630) was a key figure in the scientific revolution.

Kepler may also refer to:
Kepler (name), a surname and given name (including lists of people with the name)

Astronomy 
 Kepler-186f, a planet
 1134 Kepler, an asteroid
 Kepler (lunar crater)
 Kepler (Martian crater)
 Kepler 22, star in the Cygnus constellation
Kepler 22b, an exoplanet of interest orbiting the habitable zone of Kepler 22

Music 

Kepler (band), a defunct Canadian indie rock band
Kepler (opera), a 2009 opera by Philip Glass
Kepler (Stefanie Sun album), a 2014 album by Stefanie Sun
Kepler (Gemitaiz & MadMan album), 2014 studio album by Gemitaiz & MadMan
Kep1er (K-pop girl group), formed in 2021 out of the survival show Girls Planet 999

Places
Kepler, Kentucky, a community in the United States
Kepler Track, a hiking trail in New Zealand

Schools
Kepler (institution), the education program in Kigali, Rwanda
Kepler College, a college in Seattle, Washington

Spacecraft
Kepler space telescope, a NASA planet-hunting telescope launched in March 2009
Johannes Kepler ATV, a European Automatic Transfer Vehicle

Technology
Kepler (microarchitecture), a codename for Nvidia's GeForce 600 and 700 Series GPUs
Kepler scientific workflow system, a software system for designing, executing, and sharing scientific workflows
Kepler, a nickname for version 4.3 of Eclipse software development environment

Other uses
Kepler (novel), a 1981 novel by John Banville
 Johannes Kepler (film), a 1974 East German film

See also
 Kepler Communications, a satellite communications company in Toronto, Ontario, Canada
 Kepler Dorsum, a feature on the Martian moon Phobos
 Kepler's Supernova, a 1604 supernova
 Keppler, a name
 List of things named after Johannes Kepler